Gripenberg is a locality situated in Tranås Municipality, Jönköping County, Sweden with 292 inhabitants in 2010.

References 

Populated places in Jönköping County
Populated places in Tranås Municipality